The 2004 Pop Secret 500 was a NASCAR Nextel Cup Series stock car race held on September 5, 2004, at California Speedway in Fontana, California. Contested over 250 laps on the 2-mile (3.23 km) asphalt D-shaped oval, it was the twenty-fifth race of the 2004 NASCAR Nextel Cup Series. Elliott Sadler of Robert Yates Racing won the race.

The first fall race at California Speedway would be held on Labor Day weekend, bumping the Mountain Dew Southern 500 off as part of the 2004 NASCAR Realignment. Brian Vickers won the pole. Portions of this race were filmed for the 2005 film Herbie: Fully Loaded. Rookie Kasey Kahne got his fifth second-place finish of the season.  And this was the first NASCAR Cup Series Start for J.J. Yeley.

Qualifying 
1. Brian Vickers #25 GMAC Financial Services Chevrolet Hendrick Motorsports 187.417 mph

2. Jeremy Mayfield #19 Dodge Dealers/UAW Dodge Evernham Motorsports 186.364 mph

3. Bill Elliott #91 McDonalds Dodge Evernham Motorsports 186.307 mph

4. Kurt Busch #97 Sharpie/IRWIN FordR oush Racing 185.955 mph

5. Kasey Kahne #9 Dodge Dealers/UAW Dodge Evernham Motorsports 185.816 mph

6. Casey Mears #41 Target House Dodge Chip Ganassi Racing 185.802 mph

7. Greg Biffle #16 National Guard Ford Roush Racing 185.773 mph

8. Jeff Gordon #24 DuPont Chevrolet Hendrick Motorsports 185.658 mph

9. Scott Riggs #10 Valvoline Chevrolet MBV Motorsports 185.557 mph

10. Joe Nemechek #01 US Army Chevrolet MB2 Motorsports 185.553 mph

11. Mark Martin #6 Viagra Ford Roush Racing 185.529 mph

12. Dale Earnhardt Jr. #8 Budweiser Chevrolet Dale Earnhardt Incorporated 185.266 mph

13. Jeff Green #43 Cheerios/Betty Crocker Dodge Petty Enterprises 185.261 mph

14. Ryan Newman #12 ALLTEL/Sony Handycam Dodge Penske Racing 185.180 mph

15. Terry Labonte #5 Kellogg's Chevrolet Hendrick Motorsports 184.810 mph

16. Jimmie Johnson #48 Lowe's Chevrolet Hendrick Motorsports 184.772 mph

17. Elliott Sadler #38 M&M's Ford Robert Yates Racing 184.431 mph

18. Kyle Busch #84 CARQUEST Chevrolet Hendrick Motorsports 184.374 mph

19. Carl Edwards #99 Shop Rat Ford Roush Racing 184.360 mph

20. Ricky Rudd #21 Motorcraft/US Air Force Ford Wood Brothers Racing 184.195 mph

21. Michael Waltrip #15 NAPA Auto Parts Chevrolet Dale Earnhardt Incorporated 184.135 mph

22. Brendan Gaughan #77 Kodak/Jasper Engines Dodge Penske/Jasper Racing 184.106 mph

23. Jamie McMurray #42 Texaco Havoline Dodge Chip Ganassi Racing 184.091 mph

24. Bobby Hamilton Jr #32 Tide Chevrolet PPI Motorsports 184.073 mph

25. Dale Jarrett #88 UPS Ford Robert Yates Racing 183.932 mph

26. Rusty Wallace #2 Miller Lite Dodge Penske Racing 183.899 mph

27. Kevin Harvick #29 GM Goodwrench Chevrolet Richard Childress Racing 183.734 mph

28. Kyle Petty #45 Georgia Pacific/Brawny Dodge Petty Enterprises 183.673 mph

29. Shane Hmiel #23 Bill Davis Racing Dodge Bill Davis Racing 183.613 mph

30. Matt Kenseth #17 DeWalt Ford Roush Racing 183.589 mph

31. Sterling Marlin #40 Coors Light Dodge Chip Ganassi Racing 183.486 mph

32. J J Yeley #11 Vigoro/Home Depot Chevrolet Joe Gibbs Racing 183.243 mph

33. Tony Stewart #20 Home Depot Chevrolet Joe Gibbs Racing183.206 mph

34. Jeff Burton # 30 America Online Chevrolet Richard Childress Racing 182.987 mph

35. Robby Gordon #31 Cingular Wireless Chevrolet Richard Childress Racing 182.788 mph

36. Boris Said #136 Centrix Financial Chevrolet MB2 Motorsports 182.778 mph

37. Bobby Labonte #18 Wellbutrin XL Chevrolet Joe Gibbs Racing 182.741 mph

38. Scott Wimmer #22 Caterpillar Dodge Bill Davis Racing 182.551 mph

39. Ward Burton #0 Netzero HiSpeed ChevroletHaas CNC Racing 182.131 mph (provisional)

40. Ken Schrader #49 Schwan's Home Service Dodge BAM Racing 181.369 mph (provisional)

41. Jimmy Spencer #4 Morgan-McClure Chevrolet Morgan-McClure Racing 182.209 mph (provisional)

42. Jeff Fuller #50 Arnold Development Companies Dodge Arnold Developments 180.991 mph (provisional)

43. Derrike Cope #98 Mach One Inc Ford William Edwards no time (provisional)

Did not qualify

44. Morgan Shepherd #89 Racing With Jesus/Red Line Oil Dodge Cindy Shepherd 178.191 mph

45. Kirk Shelmerdine #72 Freddie B's Ford Kirk Shelmerdine 176.592 mph

46. Hermie Sadler #02 SCORE Motorsports Chevrolet Angela Sadler 179.730 mph

47. Kevin Lepage #37 Carter's Royal Dispos-all Dodge John Carter 180.591 mph

48. Mike Wallace #35 Gary Keller Racing Chevrolet Gary Keller Racing 179.368 mph

Results

Race statistics
 Time of race: 3:53:47
 Average Speed: 
 Pole Speed: 187.417
 Cautions: 11 for 51 laps
 Margin of Victory: 0.263
 Lead changes: 29
 Percent of race run under caution: 20.4%         
 Average green flag run: 16.6 laps

References 

Pop Secret 500
Pop Secret 500
NASCAR races at Auto Club Speedway